Kestrel 22 may refer to:

Glasflügel 604, a German sailplane design, also called the Kestrel 22
Seafarer 23 Kestrel, also called the Kestrel 22